The 2013 Delaware State Hornets baseball team represented Delaware State University in the sport of baseball during the 2013 college baseball season.  The Hornets competed in NCAA Division I and the Eastern Division of the Mid-Eastern Athletic Conference (MEAC). The team was coached by J. P. Blandin, who finished his thirteenth season at Delaware State The Hornets looked to build upon their appearance in the 2012 MEAC Baseball Tournament Championship, where they were eliminated after losing in the final game against Bethune–Cookman.

Departures
Delaware State lost 3 players due to graduation, and some players who decided to leave the team.

Roster

Schedule

|- align="center" bgcolor="ffddd"
| February 15 ||  || || Charlotte, North Carolina || 7-13 || May(1-0) || Haas(0-1) || || || 0-1 || 0-0 
|- align="center" bgcolor=
| February 16 || Charlotte || || Charlotte, North Carolina ||colspan=7| Cancelled 
|- align="center" bgcolor=
| February 16 || Charlotte || || Charlotte, North Carolina ||colspan=7| Cancelled
|- align="center" bgcolor=
| February 17 || Charlotte || || Charlotte, North Carolina ||colspan=7| Cancelled
|- align="center" bgcolor="ffddd"
| February 21 ||  || || Rock Hill, South Carolina || 2-3 || Pierpont(1-0) || Marshallsea (0-1) || Ruth(1) || 227  || 0-2 || 0-0
|- align="center" bgcolor=
| February 22 || Winthrop || || Rock Hill, South Carolina ||colspan=7| Cancelled
|- align="center" bgcolor="#ddffdd"
| February 23 || Winthrop || || Rock Hill, South Carolina || 5-0 || McClain (1-0) || Klitsch (0-1) || none || 407 || 1-2 || 0-0
|- align="center" bgcolor="#ddffdd"
| February 24 ||  || || Rock Hill, South Carolina || 6-5(10) || Marshallsea (1-1) || Flaherty (0-1) || none || || 2-2 || 0-0
|- align="center" bgcolor="#ddffdd"
| February 25 || Winthrop || || Rock Hill, South Carolina || 6-5 || Michael (1-0) || Driver (0-2) || Haas (1) || 581 || 3-2 || 0-0
|- align="center" bgcolor="ddffdd"
| February 27 ||  || || Durham, North Carolina || 9-6(7) || Candeloro (1-0) || Vernon (0-1) || none || 110 || 4-2 || 0-0
|- align="center" bgcolor="ffddd"
| February 27 || North Carolina Central || || Durham,  NC || 1-5 || Quinn (2-0) || Brown (0-1) || none || 134 || 4-3 || 0-0
|-

|- align="center" bgcolor="ddffdd"
| March 1 ||  || || Dover, Del || 8-1 || Elliott (1-0) || Fittry (0-2) || none || 48 || 5-3 || 0-0
|- align="center" bgcolor="ffddd"
| March 2 || Niagara || || Dover, Del || 11-16 || Quinlan (1-0) || McClain (1-1) || none || 53 || 5-4 || 0-0
|- align="center" bgcolor="ffddd"
| March 3 || Niagara || || Dover, Del. || 10-13 || Lysiak (1-0) || Adkins (0-1) || Schwartz (1) || 51 || 5-5 || 0-0
|- align="center" bgcolor="ddffdd"
| March 9 ||  || || Dover, Del. || 14-0 || Elliott (2-0) || Hopf || None || 117 || 6-5 || 0-0
|- align="center" bgcolor="ddffdd"
| March 9 || Saint Peter's || || Dover, Del. || 5-1 || McClain (2-1) || Yuhas || none || 102 || 7-5 || 0-0 
|- align="center" bgcolor="ddffdd"
| March 10 || Saint Peter's || || Dover, Del. || 4-0 || Adkins (1-1) || Mozeika || none || 98 || 8-5 || 0-0
|- align="center" bgcolor="ddffdd"
| March 13 ||  || || Newark, Del. || 6-4 || Gardner (1-0) || Hinkle (0-2) || Michael (1) ||  || 9-5 || 0-0
|- align="center" bgcolor="ffddd"
| March 13 || Delaware || || Newark, Del. || 5-6 || Richter (3-0) || Marshallsea (1-2) ||  || 200 || 9-6 || 0-0
|- align="center" bgcolor="ddffdd"
| March 16 ||  || || Norfolf, Virginia || 9-7 || Michael (2-0) || Bhatti (1-4) ||  || 152 || 10-6 || 1-0
|- align="center" bgcolor="ddffdd"
| March 16 || Norfolk State || || Norfolk, Virginia || 8-3(11) || Marshallsea (2-2) || Morton (1-1) ||  || 152 || 11-6 || 2-0
|- align="center" bgcolor="ddffdd" 
| March 17 || Norfolk State || || Norfolk, Virginia || 6-5 || Candeloro (2-0) || Jones (0-2) || Brown (1) || 137 || 12-6 || 3-0
|- align="center" bgcolor="ffddd"
| March 20 ||  || || Annapolis, Maryland || 10-12 || Rinehart (2-1) || Michael (2-1) || Sorenson(3) || 85 || 12-7 || 3-0
|- align="center" bgcolor="ddffdd"
| March 23 ||  || || Baltimore, Maryland || 3-1 || Elliott (3-0) || Taylor (1-3) ||  ||  || 13-7 || 4-0
|- align="center" bgcolor="ddffdd"
| March 23 || Coppin State || || Baltimore|| 7-0 || McClain (3-1) || Davies (1-3) ||  || 38 || 14-7 || 5-0
|- align="center" bgcolor="ddffdd"
| March 24 || Coppin State || || Baltimore|| 8-4 || Michael (3-1) || Burgess (0-2) || || 31 || 15-7 || 6-0
|- align="center" bgcolor="ddffdd"
| March 29 ||  || || Dover, Del. || 9-4 || Elliott (4-0) || Lopez (1-3) || Michael (2) || 97 || 16-7 || 7-0 
|- align="center" bgcolor="ddffdd"
| March 30 || Maryland Eastern Shore || || Dover, Delaware || 12-0(7) || Gardner (2-0) || Turley (1-1) || || 83 || 17-7 || 8-0
|- align="center" bgcolor="ddffdd"
| March 30 || Maryland Eastern Shore || || Dover, Delaware || 17-5 || McClain (4-1) || Bone (0-2) || || 81 || 18-7 || 9-0
|-

|- align="center" bgcolor="ddffdd"
| April 2 ||  || || Dover, Del. || 10-7 || Brown (1-1) || Garrett (0-1) || Marshallsea (1) || 39 || 19-7 || 9-0
|- align="center" bgcolor="ffddd"
| April 6 ||  || || Dover, Del. || 3-5 || Horne (2-2) || Elliott (4-1) || Bhatti (1) || 108 || 19-8 || 9-1
|- align="center" bgcolor="ffddd"
| April 6 || Norfolk State || || Dover, Del. || 2-4 || Salter (4-3) || McClain (4-2) || Morton (3) || 80 || 19-9 || 9-2
|- align="center" bgcolor="ddffdd"
| April 7 || Norfolk State || || Dover, Del. || 7-0 || Gardner (3-0) || Jones (0-4) || Michael (3) || 73 || 20-9 || 10-2 
|- align="center" bgcolor="ffddd" 
| April 9 ||  || || Dover, Del. || 1-8 || Muha (1-0) || Haas (0-2) || || 41 || 20-10 || 10-2
|- align="center" bgcolor="ddffdd"
| April 10 ||  || || Bethlehem, Pa. || 10-8 || Michael (4-1) || McNamara (0-2) ||  || 105 || 21-10 || 10-2
|- align="center" bgcolor="ddffdd"
| April 13 || Coppin State || || Dover, Del. || 10-2 || Elliott (5-1) || Taylor ||  || 57 || 22-10 || 11-2
|- align="center" bgcolor="ddffdd"
| April 14 || Coppin State || || Dover, Del. || 12-0 || Gardner (4-0) || Davies ||  || 79 || 23-10 || 12-2
|- align="center" bgcolor="ddffdd"
| April 14 || Coppin State || || Dover, Del. || 6-0 || McClain (5-2) || Burgess || || 81 || 24-10 || 13-2
|- align="center" bgcolor="ffddd"
| April 17 ||  || || Philadelphia, Pa. || 7-8 || Christensen (5-1) || Marshallsea (2-3) || || 163 || 24-11 || 13-2 
|- align="center" bgcolor="ddffdd"
| April 20 || Maryland Eastern Shore || || Princess Anne, Maryland || 7-3 || Elliott (6-1) || Smith (0-4) || Marshallsea (2) || 79 || 25-11 || 14-2
|- align="center" bgcolor="ddffdd"
| April 20 || Maryland Eastern Shore || || Princess Anne, Maryland || 7-4 || McClain (6-2) || Turley (1-3) || Michael (4) || 61 || 26-11 || 15-2 
|- align="center" bgcolor="ddffdd"
| April 21 || Maryland Eastern Shore || || Princess Anne, Maryland || 11-0 || Gardner (5-0) || Bone (0-4) || || 68 || 27-11 || 16-2 
|- align="center" bgcolor="ffddd"
| April 24 || Navy || || Dover, Del. || 2-7 || Schoberl (3-5) || Brown (1-2) || || 62 || 27-12 || 16-2
|- align="center" bgcolor="ddffdd"
| April 27 || Norfolk State || || Norfolk, Virginia || 6-1 || Elliott (7-1) || Horne (4-3) || none || 190 || 28-12 || 17-2
|- align="center" bgcolor="ddffdd"
| April 27 || Norfolk State || || Norfolk, Virginia || 8-4 || Michael (5-1) || Bhatti (2-6) || none || || 29-12 || 18-2
|- align="center" bgcolor="ffddd"
| April 28 || Norfolk State || || Norfolk, Virginia || 6-14 || Applin (2-3) || Gardner (4-1) || none || 154 || 29-13 || 18-3
|-

|- align="center" bgcolor="ddffdd"
| May 4 || Maryland Eastern Shore ||  || Dover, Del. || 5-1 || Elliott (8-1) || Smith (1-5) || none || 73 || 30-13 || 19-3
|- align="center" bgcolor="ddffdd"
| May 4 || Maryland Eastern Shore || || Dover, Del.  || 5-4 || Michael (6-1) || Repine (1-2) || none || 68 || 31-13 || 20-3
|- align="center" bgcolor="ddffdd"
| May 5 || Maryland Eastern Shore || || Dover, Del. || 11-5 || Marshallsea (3-3) || Bone (0-6) || none || 89 || 32-13 || 21-3
|- align="center"
| May 8 || Towson || || Towson, Del. ||colspan=7| Cancelled
|- align="center" bgcolor="ddffdd"
| May 10 ||  || || Dover, Del. || 6-3 || Elliott (9-1) || Borelli (0-7) || Gardner (1) || 69 || 33-13 || 22-3
|- align="center"
| May 11 || Farleigh Dickinson || || Dover, Del. ||Colspan=7| Cancelled
|- align="center"
| May 11 || Farleigh Dickinson || || Dover, Del. ||Colspan=7| Cancelled
|-

|- align="center" bgcolor="ffddd"
| May 15 ||  ||  || Norfolk, Virginia || 11-16 || Boone (4-4) || Marshallsea (3-4) || none ||  || 33-14 || 21-3
|- align="center" bgcolor="ffddd"
| May 16 ||  || || Norfolk, Virginia || 1-5 || Durapau (9-3) || Elliott (9-2) || Dailey (11) || || 33-15 || 21-3
|-

References

Delaware State
Delaware State Hornets baseball seasons
Delaware State Hornets baseball